Jan Chrzciciel Bużeński (died on 1674) was a Roman Catholic prelate who served as  Auxiliary Bishop of Gniezno (1667–1674).

On 7 Mar 1667, Jan Chrzciciel Bużeński was appointed during the papacy of Pope Alexander VII as Auxiliary Bishop of Gniezno and Titular Bishop of Halmiros. On 11 Sep 1667, he was consecrated bishop by Tomasz Leżeński, Bishop of Lutsk, with Stefan Wierzbowski, Bishop of Poznań, and Mikołaj Oborski, Titular Bishop of Laodicea in Syria, serving as co-consecrators.

See also 
Catholic Church in Poland

References 

17th-century Roman Catholic bishops in the Polish–Lithuanian Commonwealth
Bishops appointed by Pope Alexander VII
1674 deaths